Kishan Swaroop Chaudhari was a former Justice of Rajasthan High Court of India, serving the court between 2008 and 2010.

Coming from a family of lawyers, both Chaudhari's father and grandfather were also advocates in the Indian legal system. Chaudhari studied at Kishangarh and Ajmer. He was awarded Gold Medal for first standing in law. He served the subordinate courts for a period of 37 years before being elevated as a High Court Judge on 15 April 2008. He retired from High Court on 29 June 2010.

Publications
Chaudhari has published widely and his publications include:
Stay Orders and Temporary Injunctions
Punishment to Criminals and Contemnors
Benefit of Delay to Criminals (awarded Cash prize and Merit Certificate by the State Government of Rajasthan)
Land Dispute and Criminal Law; and
Right of Private Defence.
Amendment in Motor Accident Claims - Laws and Flaws (AIR 1996 Journal 01)
Limitations of Suits in Curfew (AIR1998 Journal 193)

Role as Special Investigator
Chaudhari was appointed as Chairman of Special Investigation Team to investigate Illegal Mining in the State of Rajasthan. He submitted a detailed report before the Rajasthan High Court in May 2012.

Current Role
Chaudhari has been appointed as Member of National Consumer Disputes Redressal Commission, New Delhi for a period of 5 years. He is the first Judge from the State of Rajasthan who has been appointed as Member of National Consumer Dispute Redressal Commission.

References

20th-century Indian judges
Judges of the Rajasthan High Court